The Wendigo (occasionally: Wen-Di-Go) is a fictional monster appearing in American comic books published by Marvel Comics. The Marvel character is based on the Wendigo legend of the Algonquian peoples. The monster first appeared in The Incredible Hulk (vol. 2) #162 (April 1973), created by writer Steve Englehart and artist Herb Trimpe, fighting the Incredible Hulk.

The Wendigo is not one specific person, but instead is the manifestation of a curse that can strike anyone who commits an act of cannibalism in the Canadian North Woods. Originally only one person can become the Wendigo at the time, which has led to one Wendigo being cured if another person was struck with the curse. In later years it has been revealed that a pack of Wendigos lived in the Bering Strait. At one point the Wendigo curse infected the Hulk, turning him into Wendihulk, although he was later cured.

While normally depicted as a savage beast with no control, Wendigos have appeared as part of various villainous groups, showing some restraint when not fighting. The Wendigo character has also appeared in several Marvel cartoon series.

Publication history

The Wendigo first appeared in The Incredible Hulk (vol. 2) #162 (April 1973), and was created by Steve Englehart and Herb Trimpe. Englehart recalled: "I knew about the legend of the Wendigo, and thought, between his strength and his sad story, that he sounded like a good Hulk opponent".

Fictional character biography
Several people have been afflicted with the curse of the Wendigo, including Paul Cartier, Georges Baptiste, Francois Lartigue, Lorenzo, Mauvais and others.

The curse is regional to the woods of Northern Canada and takes place, under the right conditions, when a person in the forests of Canada feeds on human flesh. This "curse of the Wendigo" was created by the Northern Gods (also known as "the Inua") in an effort to deter human cannibalism.

The cannibal transforms into a superhumanly strong, nearly indestructible, fur-covered monster: the Wendigo. He or she then roams the woods eating human beings. The Wendigo frequently fights the Hulk, Wolverine, and Alpha Flight. Paul Cartier transformed into the Wendigo, battles the Hulk, and escaped. He battles the Hulk again and encountered Wolverine, and then battles the Hulk and Wolverine; Paul Cartier is cured as college professor Georges Baptiste became the Wendigo.

Baptiste as the Wendigo later terrorizes a snowbound group. He battles Wolverine, Nightcrawler, and members of Alpha Flight; the Baptiste Wendigo is captured and cured by Shaman, although Baptiste is arrested by Department H.

Fur trapper Francois Lartigue later transforms into the Wendigo, battles the Hulk when Bruce Banner stumbled across a cabin belonging to him, and Sasquatch, and is taken to be cured by Shaman.

A reporter named Anna Brooks goes on the search for Bigfoot at the time when some children are missing where she stumbles upon a Wendigo. This sighting causes J. Jonah Jameson to dispatch Peter Parker to British Columbia, though the Wendigo's actions also attract the attention of Wolverine. This led to Spider-Man and Wolverine working together to stop the Wendigo.

One Wendigo battles the Werewolf in an issue of Marvel Comics Presents. Its most frequent appearances were in the limited series Sabretooth: Open Season #1–4, where Sabretooth is hired to kill a Wendigo, ultimately succeeding.

A few years later, a new Wendigo emerges, leading to a fight with Wolverine and She-Hulk. A local Canadian super-hero, Talisman, arrives and claims to have a magical cure for the Wendigo's condition. After a long battle, the Wendigo is defeated by a combined attack from his two opponents, and placed into S.H.I.E.L.D. custody. This Wendigo is apparently later taken in by the Canadian-based Department K and is given an electric collar that keeps the usually mindless beast under control and is integrated as a member of Weapon: P.R.I.M.E., a team of operatives each with a personal grudge against Cable. Their first mission is to take down Cable, but X-Force proves to be more than capable, as Cable teleports all their belongings out of the base and triggers the autodestruct device, though the device malfunctions and blows up early. Cut off from Cable, X-Force helps Kane, Bridge and Rictor escape the exploding base, while Grizzly, Wendigo (now referred to as Yeti) and Tigerstryke are missing. Bridge and Kane still want to arrest X-Force and calls in S.H.I.E.L.D. reinforcement, but Rictor sides with X-Force, since his grudge is only against Cable, not his former teammates. Later the Wendigo's collar is exchanged with a neurological implant which gives more control to the man inside the beast, even allowing him to speak.

During the Chaos War storyline, it is revealed that a pack of Wendigos exist in the Bering Strait after Red Hulk is attacked by a Wendigo, attracted by his camp fire while cooking a meal. A Wendigo bites the Red Hulk on the shoulder and he bleeds hot radioactive blood. The Red Hulk kills one Wendigo, while the others come to claim the body and eat it. It is also revealed that the Great Beasts are forced to manipulate the curse of the Wendigo to allow the transformation of several people instantly instead of only one, to create an army to fight with them against the Chaos King Amatsu-Mikaboshi.

These Wendigos are later somehow able to invade Las Vegas. where they are confronted by the Grey Hulk. The Grey Hulk gets help in the fight against them from the Moon Knight, Ms. Marvel, and the Sentry. Knocked into some debris, later on the Green Hulk appears. However, the Wendigos infect Hulk, turning him into the "Wendihulk" who attacks the superheroes. The sorcerer Brother Voodoo appears and cures Hulk and the other Wendigos.

When the Avengers Academy students have an encounter with former Norman Osborn subject Jeremy Biggs, it is mentioned that Biggs' company has bought a Wendigo that killed Steve, another former Osborn subject with ice-based powers.

During the 2011 "Fear Itself" storyline, a Wendigo is among the Alpha Flight villains gathered by Vindicator and Department H to spread the Master of the World's "Unity" program and to take down Alpha Flight as a member of Alpha Strike.

As part of Marvel Comics' 2012 initiative, Marvel NOW!, a Wendigo appears as a member of Department H's Omega Flight. Wendigo and the rest of Omega Flight are sent by Department H to investigate one of the Origin Bomb sites left by Ex Nihilo in Regina, Canada, a mission in which Wendigo is killed.

A Wendigo is later recruited by Kade Kilgore to join the faculty of the Hellfire Club's Hellfire Academy.

A Wendigo is summoned to Las Vegas through the wishing well of Tyrannus along with the Bi-Beast, Fin Fang Foom, Umar, and Arm'Cheddon to fight the Hulk. This Wendigo is capable of minimalistic human speech and teams up with the Bi-Beast to use the well's powers to allow them to grow to about 30 feet tall for fighting the Hulk. However, both creatures are easily defeated by the Hulk and are imprisoned along with Arm'Cheddon in the Dark Dimension by Umar until Tyrannus and Fin Fang Foom raid the dimension, allowing them to escape in the chaos.

A later confrontation between two Canadian meat packing plant employees resulted in one accidentally killing the other, and the perpetrator trying to cover it up by running the body through the meat grinder. This resulted in a mass outbreak of the Wendigo curse, which was greatly exacerbated by the curse being transmitted via bite wounds inflicted by the Wendigos, in a process akin to lycantrophy. An infection of this phenomenon beyond Canada's borders is initially prevented by the mystical limitations of the Wendigo curse. With the uncontrollably of the outbreak, the Great Beast Tanaraq (the "father" of the Wendigo) gains enough power to overthrow his fellows and intends to spread the curse across the entire world. However, the combined efforts of the X-Men, the other Beasts, and Guardian defeat his plan, resulting in the elimination of the curse.

Spider-Woman, with the help of Captain Marvel and Porcupine, later shuts down a Canadian restaurant that had been secretly serving its customers human flesh in an attempt to instigate another outbreak of Wendigos.

When Jimmy Hudson appears on Earth-616 following the 2015 "Secret Wars" storyline, the townspeople mistake him for a Wendigo and shoot him before an actual Wendigo attack occurs. Recovering from the gunshot wound, Hudson fights the Wendigo.

Roxxon later goes on an archaeological expedition to find a Wendigo. When a Wendigo attacks a scientist named Ella Sterling, she is saved by Weapon H. It was revealed that Roxxon executive Mr. Banks had a miner named Philips Waggoner eat Wendigo meat at the site where the Avingnon Party resided during a blizzard. The result of this turned Waggoner into an Ur-Wendigo which is more powerful than any normal Wendigo and can grow larger when it ate flesh. The Ur-Wendigo caught up to Weapon H and tried to eat him whole only for Doctor Strange to appear. As the Ur-Wendigo is immune to enchantments, Weapon H borrowed Doctor Strange's Ax of Angarruumus and allowed himself to be eaten by the Ur-Wendigo to kill it from within.

Powers and abilities

The Wendigo possesses a variety of superhuman physical abilities as a result of transformation by an ancient mystical curse. The curse causes anyone that ingests the flesh of another human, while within the Canadian wilderness, to transform into the Wendigo.

The Wendigo possesses superhuman strength of an unknown limit. It is known that the Wendigo possesses sufficient strength to be able to go head-on against the Hulk.

Aside from its vast strength, the tissues of the Wendigo's body are considerably stronger than those of a normal human, providing it with superhuman durability. A Wendigo's body can resist high caliber machine gun rounds without sustaining injury. If a Wendigo is injured, it can recover from the physical trauma with tremendous speed and efficiency, giving rise to the quote "strike him down and he shall only rise again". The dense fur covering the Wendigo's body grants it immunity to the harsh conditions of the extreme cold weather common in the areas in which the Wendigo has appeared. The Wendigo can be rendered unconscious by sufficient force, such as severe physical injury and trauma, but it has even been able to regenerate from being completely disemboweled. It has even survived its heart being ripped from its chest. However, consumption of a removed heart will confer all powers and even the form of the Wendigo on whoever consumes it. It is not known what effect psionic attacks would have on or against a Wendigo.

Despite the Wendigo's great size, it can run at speeds greater than that of an Olympic level athlete. The enhanced musculature of the Wendigo generates less lactic acid than the muscles of a human being, granting it superhuman levels of stamina.

The Wendigo's fingers and toes are tipped with razor sharp, retractable claws that are capable of piercing even the Hulk's skin, a feat usually reserved for adamantium, due to a combination of the toughness of the claws and the Wendigo's massive physical strength.

Even though each Wendigo was once a normal human, in most cases very little is left of the person it once was. It possesses little intelligence and can be considered non-sentient, and with the exception of brief and rare instances, is unable to remember things about its former life. It also lacks the ability to speak anything other than its own name, which it often will yell and repeat during its attacks. Sorcerers, such as Mauvais and Lorenzo, have been able to avoid this aspect of the curse, using magic to gain the power of the Wendigo while keeping their intelligence and their power of speech.

Other Wendigo
In The Amazing Spider-Man #277, a creature called Wendigo appears. This Wendigo seemed to be a ghost-like being whose very presence in New York caused a blizzard to strike. Though the creature only makes its appearance at the end of the comic, the story makes it obvious that it is stalking Spider-Man the entire time he was chasing a group of kidnappers. This Wendigo seemed to be able to change size and become invisible; it was also reptilian in appearance and pale green in color.

In Spider-Man issues #8–12 (the "Perceptions" story arc), a Wendigo-like creature is blamed in the deaths of several children near Hope, British Columbia and terrorizing the town. Spider-Man's alter ego, Peter Parker, is sent to take pictures during the media frenzy that follows. Wolverine, having previous experience with Wendigos and having concern for the creature's welfare, comes to the town and contacts Peter Parker directly, seeking Spider-Man's assistance. Together, Spider-Man and Wolverine are able to determine the real cause of death among the children. The Wendigo in "Perceptions" has an appearance very similar to other incarnations of the Wendigo, yet seems to be a different manifestation. For example, this version of the Wendigo is more vulnerable to harm than those that battled the Hulk, as it suffers a significant wound from a hunter's bullet and sustains injury when struck by a car. Additionally, it does not appear very aggressive, unless provoked, nor is it interested in consuming human flesh, feeding primarily on deer. In fact, when the Wendigo comes across the corpse of a child, the creature attempts to return the body to town instead of consuming it.

Other versions

Earth X
In the Earth X continuity, an army of Wendigos is formed due to the curse afflicting Jamie Madrox after he chooses to eat one of his own duplicated bodies in response to the strict rationing of food that came with the declining animal population.

MC2
The Wendigo makes another appearance in the MC2 imprint of Marvel Comics, an alternate future featuring, among others, the children of existing Marvel superheroes. In an issue of Wild Thing, the Hulk, Doctor Strange, Wolverine, and Wolverine's daughter Wild Thing encounter a large number of Wendigos, which turn out to be a lost Cub Scout troop that had eaten its scoutmaster. Doctor Strange is able to remove the curse from the children and remove their memory of the events.

Infinity Warps
In Warp World, a copy of the Marvel Universe which was folded in half during the Infinity Wars storyline, Wendigo was fused with Tigra, creating Wentigra. Greer Baptise was a detective who was mortally wounded by a gunshot and was retrieved by a cult known as the Cat People. In order for her to survive, they offered her to eat human meat, which cursed her into becoming Wentigra. She was then unwillingly cured by Weapon Hex (a fusion of X-23 and the Scarlet Witch).

In other media

Television
 The Wendigo appears in The Incredible Hulk episode "And the Wind Cries...Wendigo!", with vocal effects provided by Leeza Miller McGee. This version is the result of a curse placed upon a Native American warrior, who is eventually defeated and restored by the Hulk.
 The Wendigo appears in the Wolverine and the X-Men episode "Wolverine vs. Hulk". This version was created by super-soldier experiments conducted by Nick Fury, and possesses horns and the ability to convert others into Wendigos via its bite.
 The Wendigo makes a non-speaking cameo appearance in The Avengers: Earth's Mightiest Heroes episode "Breakout, Part 1" while escaping from the Raft.
 The Wendigo appears in the Avengers Assemble episode "Avengers: Impossible".
 The Wendigo appears in the Hulk and the Agents of S.M.A.S.H. episode "Wendigo Apocalypse". This version possesses the ability to convert others into Wendigos.
 A Wendigo King appears in the Ultimate Spider-Man episode "Contest of Champions" Pt. 1.

Film
 A pack of Wendigos appear in Iron Man and Hulk: Heroes United.
 In the unproduced X-Men: Fear the Beast, the Wendigo was planned to be the main antagonist. This version would have been based on the Paul Cartier incarnation, who was depicted as a fellow scientist and colleague of Hank McCoy with a similar mutation and accidentally transforms himself into the mindless Wendigo.

Video games
 The Wendigo appears as a boss in X-Men.
 The Wendigo appears as a boss in X2: Wolverine's Revenge.
 Monsters based on the Wendigo called the W.E.N.D.I.G.O. Prototype (Weaponized Experiment Neurodendritic Incident Gamma Zero) appear in X-Men Origins: Wolverine. They are genetically engineered monsters whose transformations are triggered by adrenaline surges and serve as bosses in Weapon X facilities.
 The Wendigo appears in Avengers Initiative.
 The Wendigo appears in Marvel Super Hero Squad Online.
 The Wendigo appears as a playable character in Lego Marvel's Avengers.
 The Wendigo appears as a non-player character in Marvel's Guardians of the Galaxy.

References

Characters created by Herb Trimpe
Characters created by Steve Englehart
Comics characters introduced in 1973
Fictional cannibals
Fictional characters with immortality
Fictional characters with superhuman durability or invulnerability
Fictional monsters
Marvel Comics characters who can move at superhuman speeds
Marvel Comics characters with accelerated healing
Marvel Comics characters with superhuman strength
Marvel Comics supervillains
Mythology in Marvel Comics
Wendigos in popular culture
Wolverine (comics) characters
X-Men supporting characters